Szabolcs Thomas Orley (February 21, 1934 – July 3, 2008) was an American fencer. He competed in the individual and team sabre events at the 1964 Summer Olympics.

References

External links
 

1934 births
2008 deaths
American male sabre fencers
Olympic fencers of the United States
Fencers at the 1964 Summer Olympics
Sportspeople from Budapest
Hungarian emigrants to the United States